Beatriz Ferrari De Arias is a Uruguayan church official. She was president of the Evangelical Methodist Church in Uruguay from 1994 until 2000.

Life
Ferrari worked for three years as a volunteer missionary, working with young people in Spain. For ten years she then worked as the Secretary for Women and Children Concerns of the Latin American Council of Churches. As a lay woman, she was elected president of the Methodist Church in Uruguay in 1994, and served as president until 2000.

References

Year of birth missing (living people)
Living people
Religious leaders in Uruguay
Women Christian religious leaders
Methodist religious workers